Lichada (Licháda) is a village in Euboea, Greece. Since the 2011 local government reform it is part of the municipality Istiaia-Aidipsos, of which it is a municipal unit. The municipal unit has an area of 39.891 km2. In 2011 its population was 181 for the village and 1,122 for the community, which includes the villages Agios Georgios (pop. 868), Vasilina, Gregolimano, Kavos, Kokkinias and the uninhabited islands Monolia and Strongyli.  Lichada is located at the western tip of Euboea. It is 10 km north of Agios Konstantinos, 16 km west of Aidipsos, 37 km east of Lamia and 75 km northwest of Chalcis. Lichada suffered damage from the 2007 Greek forest fires.

Population

See also
List of settlements in the Euboea regional unit

References

External links

Lichada (community) on GTP Travel Pages
Lichada (town) on GTP Travel Pages

Populated places in Euboea